Tuross Head is a seaside village on the south coast of New South Wales, Australia. It is approximately halfway between the townships of Moruya and Narooma, a few kilometres off the Princes Highway. As of the 2016 census, Tuross Head has a population of 2,241 people.

This quiet seaside community is located on a headland that juts out into the Tasman Sea with Coila Lake to the north and Tuross Lake and Tuross River to the south making the headland virtually surrounded by water and joined to the mainland by a thin isthmus.

The two lakes provide a safe environment for water-based activities with the opportunity for sailing on Coila Lake and for restricted water skiing in the Tuross Lake broadwater. Both have easily accessible waterways to explore by kayak or run-about with boat ramp facilities.

There are coastal walks and a cycleway that provides a link from one end of the village to the other. There is a diversity of local bushland to explore from coastal dunes to three protected sections of littoral rainforest.

The village offers a range of accommodation including bed and breakfasts, camping sites, a motel and a wide selection of holiday houses to suit most budgets. There is a local shopping centre, a golf and bowling club and a choice of cafes and restaurants.

Demographics 
The median age of people in Tuross Head was 59 years.

Notable natives and residents
 Eva Mylott - opera singer and grandmother of actor Mel Gibson
 Steve Starling - Australian television fisherman.

Notes and references

 https://quickstats.censusdata.abs.gov.au/census_services/getproduct/census/2016/quickstat/SSC13979#:~:text=In%20the%202016%20Census%2C%20there,up%201.6%25%20of%20the%20population.&text=The%20median%20age%20of%20people,State%20Suburbs)%20was%2059%20years.

External links
 South Coast Travel Guide - Tuross Head Information
 Eurobodalla Tourism - Tuross Head Information

Towns in New South Wales
Towns in the South Coast (New South Wales)
Coastal towns in New South Wales